Olfert Fasvier Fischer (14 March 1700 – 7 December 1761) was a naval officer in the service of the Danish crown who became a director of the Danish Asia Company and completed his career as a vice admiral.

Personal life
Born on 14 March 1700, Olfert Fasvier Fischer (his middle name was often abbreviated to Fas) was the son of the Dutch skipper and merchant Olfert Vaese who had settled in Copenhagen with his wife Alida Brunsman. He married twice,
in 1720 to Sidsel Marie Hassel who died in 1737. Neither her year of birth nor any children are recorded.
and in 1738 with his second wife Anna Ackerman, the 18-year-old daughter of a wine merchant, with whom he had ten daughters and three sons. Of the three sons all joined the navy, but two died young including Friderich Gerhart Fischer who was lost when his ship foundered in the Atlantic. The third son was Johan Olfert Fischer who also became a Vice Admiral.
In 1745 the manor house of Marienborg at Lyngby, just north of Copenhagen, was built for Olfert Fas Fischer. Today it is the official residence of the Danish Prime Minister.

Career
As a cadet from the age of twelve, Fisker served under Andreas Rosenpalm in the Great Northern War until, in 1719 he was commissioned as a junior lieutenant. In 1715 he was with the small ship Cronen in the Pommeranian flotilla and quartered at Greifswalde in January and February 1716. In 1717 he served in the ship-of-the-line Lovise and in 1719 in the frigate Raae.
From 1720 to 1722 he was employed on merchant ships based in Norway and was regularly employed thereafter.
Promoted to senior lieutenant in 1725, he was second in command of the gunboat Friderichshald in the squadron, and the following year served in the ship-of-the-line Slesvig with the Danish squadron which, together with an English squadron, blockaded the Russian fleet in Reval (modern day Tallinn) in 1726.
In 1728 he was granted four months leave of absence to travel privately to Norway.

1732 saw his promotion to captain-lieutenant, serving on the ship-of-the-line Prindsesse Charlotte Amalie and the following year to full Captain.  In 1739 he became a director of the Danish Asia Company, a post he held until 1752. In 1743 he was in command of the ship-of-the-line Oldenburg
Rising in seniority and rank to Commodore in 1747, Fas Fischer sat on several commissions at the Danish admiralty including the Rigging Commission in 1749, and in 1751 on both the Defence Commission and that reviewing the Articles of War. In the year before he was promoted to flag rank, he was appointed as a deputy at the Danish admiralty.
Following promotion to rear admiral in 1755 he became, in 1756, interim head of the Holmen dockyard and then, in 1758, commander of a squadron convoying large troop transports from Norway and Denmark to Eckenførde in Schleswig-Holstein. 
It was also in 1758 that Fischer was promoted to vice admiral.

Death and pensions
He died on 7 December 1761 in Copenhagen and was buried in the cemetery of the German Reformed Church, Copenhagen.

His widow sought a pension from the admiralty for herself and the nine children (two sons and seven daughters) who were still minors - the youngest still a babe-in-arms. This was granted in the sum of 300 Rigs dollar annually, and on the death of their mother twenty years later the six remaining unmarried daughters received a single supplementary payment of 30 Rdl.

Notes

References

Citations
Partial translation from Danish Wikipedia :da:Olfert Fas Fischer, augmented and checked by references given.
Blumensaadt & Ingemand - Vores Slægt (lineage website) - Sidsel Marie Hassel
Project Runeberg - C. With on Olvert Fas Fischer in Danish Biographical Lexicon Volume 5 pages 177-178
Royal Danish Naval Museum - List of Ships
Royal Danish Naval Museum - Skibregister for record cards on most individual ships
Project Runeberg: C With on Olfert Fas Fischer in  DBL Vol 5 pages 177 -178 
Topsøe-Jensen, H.: Olfert Fas Fischer in Dansk Biografisk Leksikon at lex.dk. accessed 15. June 2020  
T. A. Topsøe-Jensen og Emil Marquard (1935) "Officerer i den dansk-norske Søetat 1660-1814 og den danske Søetat 1814-1932".  Volume 1 and Volume 2

1700 births
1761 deaths
18th-century Danish naval officers
Royal Danish Navy admirals
Danish admirals
Danish Asiatic Company people
Danish people of Dutch descent